Pine Rest Christian Mental Health Services is a psychiatric hospital and behavioral health provider, with the main treatment campus located in Gaines Township, Michigan. The Chief Executive Officer and President is Dr. Mark Eastburg, appointed December, 2006.

Pine Rest is one of the five largest free-standing behavioral health providers in the U.S., offering services including addiction treatment and recovery, extensive child and adolescent programs, postpartum and other perinatal mood disorder treatment, senior care services, and electroconvulsive therapy (ECT) and transcranial magnetic stimulation therapy (TMS). In addition to the main campus in Grand Rapids, Pine Rest also has just under 20 outpatient locations throughout Michigan and two in Iowa.

Pine Rest's inpatient hospitalization program is licensed for 200 beds, with residential services for adolescent boys and girls; older adults coping with dementia; those needing addiction services; those in need of sub-acute detoxification program services; and developmentally disabled persons.

Pine Rest seeks to incorporate faith and healing into the care of patients: it has an active chaplain service to offer spiritual care to the patients. In addition, Clinical Pastoral Education is offered through Pine Rest.

History

It was founded in 1910 as the Christian Psychopathic Hospital.

In 2007 the hospital opened the Gerald & Jane-Ann Postma Center for Worship and Education, a $3.7 million training center targeted at nursing, behavior health and pastoral students and Pine Rest staff members. It also houses a chapel for campus residents and for training pastoral education students. An art gallery, named for Bruce and Mary Leep is inside the Postma Center.

In 2008, Pine Rest opened the Interactions Residential Treatment Center at its main campus. The secured, 16-bed residential treatment center was designed for helping adults with chronic and/or persistent mental illness, including those with co-occurring mild development disabilities and mental illnesses, or with a mental illness and substance abuse issues.

In December 2012, Pine Rest implemented its Mother and Baby Program designed to provide short-term, intensive treatment to women who are pregnant or up to one year postpartum and struggling with perinatal mood disorders.

In 2013, the Van Andel-Cook Center for Dementia and Geriatric Behavioral Health opened as part of a 3-phase expansion project on the Pine Rest main campus in Cutlerville. 349 donors contributed more than $3.2 million toward the total cost of the project. Services include an older adult inpatient unit, outpatient services such as neuropsychological evaluation, memory disorder assessment and treatment recommendations, and diagnosis and treatment for senior cognitive and behavioral health issues. The center was named for its lead donors, the Foundation of Jay and Betty Van Andel and the Peter C. and Emajean Cook Foundation.

In February 2014, a 22-bed inpatient hospital unit opened as part of a 3-phase facilities investment construction project. Services at the Redwood Unit are dedicated to the treatment and care of patients with co-occurring disorders (mental health diagnosis and substance abuse diagnosis). The 20,417 sq ft wing includes four single barrier-free rooms, six single rooms and six semi-private rooms.

In March 2014, the Pine Rest Professional Practice Group (PPG) opened up a new outpatient clinic in Portage, MI. The building consists of five offices, has nine therapists, and provides therapy services for those with mental health disorders and/or substance use disorders.

In July 2014, the first class of residents started work in Pine Rest's four-year Psychiatric Residency Program led by Director Dr. William Sanders.

In the fall of 2016 plans for the Flex unit were put into play. The flex unit will consist of  young adults and older adolescents, as well as adults. It is in its name that the unit will flex, or have flexibility to meet population needs.

In the spring of 2019 Pine Rest opened a regional first Psychiatric Urgent Care Center on their Cutlerville Campus. The center is meant to provide same-day assessment and treatment for people experiencing acute psychiatric symptoms who can't wait for routine outpatient services, a common problem for patients seeking mental health treatment. The goal is to reduce the number of hospitalizations due to mental health. "This is a national issue and we’re going to take sort of a national level thinking and bring it here to West Michigan, to serve the community better,” said Pine Rest President and CEO Mark Eastburg.

Grand Rapids area hospitals had 14,623 behavioral health visits to emergency rooms in 2016, according to Pine Rest.

The Psychiatric Urgent Care Center is expected to reduce wait times for psychiatric assessments and will provide clinical services in a calm environment for those experiencing psychiatric symptoms such as: depression, anxiety, panic attacks, suicidal thoughts, disturbing thoughts, acute grief reactions, trouble managing daily activities and substance abuse disorders.

Programs and Services

Psychiatric Urgent Care 

The center, opened April 15, 2019,and treated 6,600 patients in its first year The center is designed to provide immediate assessment and treatment for adults aged 18-65 experiencing acute psychiatric symptoms who cannot wait for routine outpatient intervention. The Pine Rest urgent care is headed by a physician with a specialty in psychiatric emergency care and staffed by physician assistants and nurse practitioners with specialized training in behavioral health. Most patients at the psychiatric urgent care are seen within 15 minutes of their arrival, and spend an average of two hours at the clinic.

Outpatient Programs 
Pine Rest clinicians provide counseling, therapy, consultation, assessment and testing for all ages in convenient, welcoming environments. Clinics are locations in Michigan and Iowa. Outpatient therapy is also available via teletherapy in Michigan and Iowa.

Lectures, classes and events

Pine Rest sponsors a variety of workshops, classes and special events throughout the year for professionals and the general public. Medical and clinical topics are geared toward working professionals with MERC accreditation, while topics for the public include, but are not limited to, anger management for adults and teens, eating disorders, families living with mental illness, postpartum depression and other perinatal mood disorders, dementia,and the effects of aging.

Rustic Market Thrift Store

Proceeds from the Rustic Market Thrift Store in Gaines Township are used to extend the ministry of Pine Rest Christian Mental Health Services through the Patient Assistance Fund (PAF). The fund provides financial assistance to those in the community who need mental health care, but have little or no means to pay for services. Since opening in 1971, the Rustic Market has generated over $1 million for PAF.
 
Rustic Market gives residential employees coupons during the holidays.

References

External links
Pine Rest Christian Mental Health Services
Pine Rest CPE site
Pine Rest Special Section on M Live/Grand Rapids Press

Hospital buildings completed in 1910
Psychiatric hospitals in Michigan